Rolf Ruff (7 March 1919 – 1998) was a Swiss equestrian. He competed in two events at the 1960 Summer Olympics.

References

External links
 

1919 births
1998 deaths
Swiss male equestrians
Olympic equestrians of Switzerland
Equestrians at the 1960 Summer Olympics
Sportspeople from Zürich
20th-century Swiss people